Nicole Kassell (born 1972) is an American film and television director who is noted for her work on films such as The Woodsman and on TV in series such as Vinyl, The Leftovers and Watchmen.

For her work on Watchmen, Kassell has received numerous awards including a Directors Guild of America Award for Outstanding Directorial Achievement in Dramatic Series for the Watchmen episode "It's Summer and We're Running Out of Ice" and, as an executive producer, a Primetime Emmy Award for Outstanding Limited or Anthology Series, including a nomination for the Primetime Emmy Award for Outstanding Directing for a Limited or Anthology Series or Movie.

Early life

Kassell was born in Philadelphia, Pennsylvania, raised in Charlottesville, VA where she attended St. Anne's-Belfiield School. Her father, Dr. Neal Kassell, a University of Virginia medical professor, performed two brain surgeries on Joe Biden in 1988 to repair his aneurysm and the two have remained friends ever since.

She earned a BA in Art history from Columbia University, and received her MFA from the Tisch School of the Arts at NYU. While a student at NYU, she made three short films, including The Green Hour, which was screened at the Sundance Film Festival in 2002. While attending NYU she received full scholarship for two years.

Career

Film 
A year earlier, she had won the Slamdance Screenplay Competition for her first feature-length project, The Woodsman (2004 film), adapted from Steven Fechter's 1997 minimalist play she had seen staged at The Actors Studio in New York City. Her enthusiasm for it convinced Lee Daniels, one of the producers of Monster's Ball, to help her get funding for the film version. When he approached Kevin Bacon, the actor was so impressed by the script, about a convicted child molester forced to deal with social prejudice and the fear he will not be able to control his dark urges after he is released from prison, that he suggested he star in the movie opposite wife Kyra Sedgwick. The Woodsman competed at Sundance and the Toronto International Film Festival, was featured in the Director’s Fortnight at the Cannes Film Festival, and eventually was released to the public in 2004. Kassell's second feature film, A Little Bit of Heaven, a romantic comedy starring Kate Hudson and Gael García Bernal, had its first release in February 2011 in the UK.

She has adapted Arthur Miller's play The Ride Down Mt. Morgan for the big screen. The project has been in pre-production since 2004 and will reportedly feature a cast that includes Diane Keaton, Emily Blunt and Michael Douglas if it goes into production. Douglas would also serve as executive producer.

In February 2021, Kassell was chosen to direct a new adaptation of The Wonderful Wizard of Oz at New Line Cinema.

Television 

Kassell has directed episodes of the series Cold Case and 3 lbs (both on CBS), The Closer (on TNT), The Killing (on AMC), Vinyl (on HBO) and The Americans (on FX). She also is writing an adaptation of the book Bad Medicine for HBO.

In 2018, it was announced that Kassell would direct the pilot for the HBO series Watchmen. In January 2020, Kassell won the Directors Guild of America Award for Dramatic Series for directing the Watchmen episode "It's Summer and We're Running Out of Ice".

Kassell recently signed with WME.

Personal life 
Kassell is now living in New York City, with her husband and two children. In an interview for a Complex article, Kassell described part of her ethnic identity and how it informed her work on the Watchmen series: "My father is Jewish and I am half-Jewish. We all lived in Charlottesville, and I’m just realizing in talking with you, that my ancestors escaped the pogroms of Ukraine. How much is there actually in my DNA history that I’m not even aware of that I am pouring into this?."

Filmography 
Short films

Feature film

Television

Awards and nominations

References

External links
Nicolekassell.com 

1972 births
American film directors
20th-century American Jews
American people of Ukrainian-Jewish descent
American screenwriters
American television directors
American women film directors
American women television directors
Living people
Artists from Philadelphia
American women screenwriters
Tisch School of the Arts alumni
Columbia College (New York) alumni
21st-century American Jews